Eulima dubia is a species of sea snail, a marine gastropod mollusk in the family Eulimidae. The species is one of a number within the genus Eulima.

This is a taxon inquirendum as Melania (Eulima) dubia Anton, 1838

References

External links
 Anton, H. E. (1838). Verzeichniss der Conchylien welche sich in der Sammlung von Herrmann Eduard Anton befinden. Herausgegeben von dem Besitzer. Halle: Anton. xvi + 110 pp

dubia
Gastropods described in 1838